Oddworld Adventures 2 is a 2000 Game Boy Color platformer game developed by Saffire and published by GT Interactive, and is a spin-off in the Oddworld series based upon the title Oddworld: Abe's Exoddus, released in 1998.

Gameplay 

Described as an "action-puzzle platformer", Oddworld Adventures 2 features a similar plot to Abe's Exoddus in which the titular character Abe journeys to Necrum to stop Glukkons from desecrating the graves of the Mudokon race. The game requires the player to traverse through 24 levels, with basic platforming mechanics such as running, sneaking, jumping and climbing. The game also features a puzzle system in which the player is required to possess other creatures or issue instructions using commands to complete actions such as open doors or use switches. The command system, 'GameSpeak', allows Abe to command allies to follow him, wait, and 'work' to complete actions.

Reception 

Reception of Oddworld Adventures 2 was lukewarm, with many reviews focusing upon the merits of the game's port to the Game Boy Color. Jason White of Allgame praised the developers for the faithful adaptation of Abe's Exoddus, stating "nothing was left out of this port", and expressed surprise that the game was "straightforward and easy to (play)" on a Game Boy Color. In contrast, Eliot Fish of Hyper stated the game "isn't terribly user-friendly", stating that the "controls feel a little inaccurate" and "the backgrounds are confusing to figure out...it's very hard to tell where you're meant to jump to".

The graphics of the game were a negative feature of the game for many critics. Craig Harris of IGN noted "the graphics suffer heavily on the translation from the vibrant, rendered look of the PlayStation to the portable, pixelated rendition on the Game Boy Color. Backgrounds are flat and lifeless (and) the lack of any perspective hurts some of the game." Similarly Computer and Video Games stated the visuals are "unfair and frustrating", as "many of the levels require a super human level of visual skills...trying not no squish little slugs which are only a few itty-bitty pixels high".

References

External links 
 

2000 video games
Cinematic platform games
Game Boy Color games
Game Boy Color-only games
GT Interactive games
Oddworld
Saffire games
Single-player video games
Video games developed in the United States